RV Sally Ride (AGOR-28) is a  owned by the United States Navy and operated by the Scripps Institution of Oceanography. The ship was named for Sally Ride, a US astronaut.

Construction
Sally Ride is a commercially designed, monohull research vessel, capable of both coastal and deep ocean oceanography operations.  The ship is equipped with cranes and winches for over-the-side loading of research equipment and supplies, as well as accommodations for twenty-four scientists. It is powered by a multi-drive, low-voltage, diesel electric propulsion system for efficiency and lower maintenance and fuel costs. Both Neil Armstrong-class ships have oceanographic equipment allowing deep ocean mapping and information technology for ship monitoring and worldwide land-based communication.

See also 
  - Sister ship
  - Predecessor to the Neil Armstrong
  - British equivalent
  - Predecessor to the James Cook

References

 

University-National Oceanographic Laboratory System research vessels
2014 ships
Ships built in Anacortes, Washington
Scripps Institution of Oceanography
Neil Armstrong-class oceanographic research ships
Sally Ride